Vyacheslav Mikhailovich Lopatin (born 4 May 1984) is a Russian principal dancer with the Bolshoi Ballet.

Vyacheslav Lopatin was born in Voronezh, Russia, and studied at the Voronezh Choreographic College, after which he apprenticed at the Moscow Choreographic Academy. In 2003 he joined the Bolshoi Ballet, where he presently works under the tutelage of Boris Akimov. He was promoted to the rank of first soloist in October 2009, to leading soloist in September 2011 and appointed to the rank of principal dancer in July 2017.

In 2009 Lopatin and Natalia Osipova received a special prize from the jury of the Golden Mask award for their partnership in the Bolshoi's production of La Sylphide.

Repertoire
La Sylphide (choreography: Johan Kobborg, after August Bournonville): James
Giselle (choreography: Vladimir Vasiliev, after Jean Coralli and Jules Perrot): Albrecht, pas d'action
Giselle (choreography: Yuri Grigorovich, after Jean Coralli and Jules Perrot): peasant pas de deux
Coppélia (choreography: Sergei Vikharev, after Marius Petipa and Enrico Cecchetti): Frantz
Swan Lake (choreography: Yuri Grigorovich, after Marius Petipa and Lev Ivanov): Jester
The Sleeping Beauty (choreography: Yuri Grigorovich, after Marius Petipa): Prince Désiré, Bluebird
La Bayadère (choreography: Yuri Grigorovich, after Marius Petipa): Bronze Idol
Don Quixote (choreography: Vladimir Vasiliev, after Marius Petipa and Alexander Gorsky): Basilio
Le Corsaire (choreography: Yuri Burlaka and Alexei Ratmansky, after Marius Petipa): pas d'esclaves
Esmeralda (choreography: Yuri Burlaka and Vasily Medvedev, after Marius Petipa): Acteon
Paquita, grand pas (choreography: Yuri Burlaka, after Marius Petipa): pas de trois
La Fille mal gardée (choreography by Frederick Ashton): Colas, Alain
Marco Spada (choreography: Pierre Lacotte): Groom
The Pharaoh's Daughter (choreography: Pierre Lacotte): Lord Wilson/Taor,
The Nutcracker (choreography: Yuri Grigorovich): Nutcracker Prince, Harlequin
Romeo and Juliet (choreography: Yuri Grigorovich): Mercutio
The Golden Age (choreography: Yuri Grigorovich): Compere
Anyuta (choreography: Vladimir Vasiliev): Modest Alexeyevich
Cipollino (choreography: Genrikh Mayorov): Cipollino
The Lady of the Camellias (choreography: John Neumeier): Count N. (first interpreter at the Bolshoi)
The Bright Stream (choreography: Alexei Ratmansky): Pyotr, Accordionist
Flames of Paris (choreography: Alexei Ratmansky, after Vasily Vainonen): Philippe, Jerome
Lost Illusions (choreography: Alexei Ratmansky): Lucien
Romeo and Juliet (choreography: Alexei Ratmansky): Romeo
The Taming of the Shrew (choreography: Jean-Christophe Maillot): Gremio (first interpreter)
Hamlet (choreography: Radu Poklitaru): Yorick
A Hero of Our Time (choreography: Yuri Possokhov): Old Woman/Yanko in "Taman" (first interpreter), Pechorin, in "Princess Mary"
Nureyev (choreography: Yuri Possokhov): Pupil/Letter to Rudi (first interpreter)
Ondine (choreography: Viacheslav Samodurov): the Fugitive
The Winter's Tale (choreography: Christopher Wheeldon): Florizel
Petrushka (choreography: Michel Fokine): Petrushka
Études (choreography: Harald Lander)
Glinka Pas de Trois (choreography: George Balanchine)
Tarantella (choreography: George Balanchine)
Jewels (choreography: George Balanchine): Emeralds, Rubies (Bolshoi premiere)
In the Upper Room (choreography: Twyla Tharp)
Herman Schmerman (choreography: William Forsythe)
Forgotten Land (choreography: Jiří Kylián): Couple in Red
Class Concert (choreography: Asaf Messerer)
Jeu de cartes (choreography: Alexei Ratmansky; Bolshoi premiere)
Russian Seasons (choreography: Alexei Ratmansky): Couple in Yellow, Couple in Claret
Misericordes (choreography: Christopher Wheeldon; world premiere)
Classical Symphony (choreography: Yuri Possokhov)
Remanso (choreography: Nacho Duato)
Chroma (choreography: Wayne McGregor; Bolshoi premiere)
Faun (choreography: Sidi Larbi Cherkaoui; Bolshoi premiere)

Filmography
Coppélia (choreography: Sergei Vikharev), Bolshoi Ballet, 2011: as Frantz
The Lady of the Camellias (choreography: John Neumeier), Bolshoi Ballet, 2015: as Count N.
The Taming of the Shrew (choreography: Jean-Christophe Maillot), Bolshoi Ballet, 2016: as Gremio
The Golden Age (choreography: Yuri Grigorovich), Bolshoi Ballet, 2016: as the Compere
A Hero of Our Time (choreography: Yuri Possokhov), Bolshoi Ballet, 2017: as Yanko

References

External links
Lopatin's page on the website of the Bolshoi Theatre (English)

1984 births
Living people
Bolshoi Ballet principal dancers
People from Voronezh
Recipients of the Golden Mask
Russian male ballet dancers
21st-century Russian ballet dancers